Radik Fesikhovich Khayrullov (born 23 May 1992) is a Russian football player. He plays for FC Novosibirsk.

Club career
He made his professional debut in the Russian Professional Football League for FC Volga Ulyanovsk on 18 July 2014 in a game against FC Lada-Togliatti Togliatti.

He made his Russian Football National League debut for FC Olimpiyets Nizhny Novgorod on 8 July 2017 in a game against FC Avangard Kursk.

References

External links
 

1992 births
Sportspeople from Ulyanovsk
Living people
Russian footballers
Association football defenders
FC Volga Ulyanovsk players
FC Nizhny Novgorod (2015) players
FC Armavir players
FC Chayka Peschanokopskoye players
FC SKA Rostov-on-Don players
Russian First League players
Russian Second League players